Serene Lakes (also called Ice Lakes) are a pair of freshwater lakes, located in the Sierra Nevada Mountains in Northern California, about  northwest of Lake Tahoe. Located in the unincorporated community of Soda Springs in Placer County, CA, the lakes are adjacent to Interstate 80 to the north and Donner Pass to the east. The Geographic Names Information System ID for Serene Lakes is 254806.

History 
Serene Lakes was discovered during the mid-1800s, when the First transcontinental railroad was being constructed. The lakes were located along several routes during the California Gold Rush, including the historic California Trail, and the first settler, Fitz William Redding Jr, arrived in 1866.

Before the widespread adoption of refrigeration, Serene Lakes served as a source of ice for the city of San Francisco, earning the lakes the name "Ice Lakes". When author Mark Twain visited the lakes, he named them Lake Dulzura and Lake Serena, which was combined to form "Serene Lakes".

Recreation 
Summer activities at Serene Lakes include fishing, windsurfing, sailing, and paddle-boating. Swimming and watersports are only permitted in Lake Dulzura, in order to protect the drinking water derived from Lake Serena. Lake Dulzura contains a public beach, dock, and beach volleyball courts. The lakes are surrounded by several hiking trails, including Castle Pass, Summit Station Trail, and Hoelter Hall Trail. Many of the trails span the mountains around the lake, some leading to mountaintops, such as Lola's Lookout.

Winter activities include cross-country skiing and snowshoeing. Serene Lakes are also surrounded by several ski resorts, including Sugar Bowl Ski Resort and Soda Springs Mountain Resort, and ice skating is available when the frozen lake is accessible.

See also 
 List of lakes in California

References 

Lakes of California
Lakes of Northern California
Lakes of Placer County, California
Tourist attractions in Placer County, California